Maha Mutharam is a village and a mandal in Jayashankar Bhupalpally district in the state of Telangana in India.

References

External links 

Villages in Jayashankar Bhupalpally district
Mandals in Jayashankar Bhupalpally district